Ilyas Lefrancq (born 3 December 2003) is a professional footballer who plays for the fourth-tier Belgian Division 2 team Jong KV Mechelen (the reserve squad of Mechelen). Born in Belgium, he is a youth international for Morocco.

Career
Lefrancq made his professional debut for OH Leuven on 3 April 2022 in the home match against Antwerp, when he was subbed on for Mathieu Maertens with ten minutes left on the clock.

On 17 June 2022, Lefrancq signed a two-year contract with Mechelen.

International career
Born in Belgium, Lefrancq is of Moroccan descent. He debuted with the Morocco U20s in a friendly 2–1 loss to the Spain U20s on 26 April 2022.

References

External links

2003 births
Belgian sportspeople of Moroccan descent
Living people
Moroccan footballers
Morocco youth international footballers
Belgian footballers
Association football midfielders
Oud-Heverlee Leuven players
K.V. Mechelen players
Belgian Pro League players